This is a list of gliders/sailplanes of the world (this reference lists all gliders with references, where available). 
Note: Any aircraft can glide for a short time, but gliders are designed to glide for longer.

Iranian miscellaneous constructors 
 AII AVA-101 – Aviation Industries of Iran

Notes

Further reading

External links

Lists of glider aircraft